In logic, a set of symbols is commonly used to express logical representation. The following table lists many common symbols, together with their name, how they should be read out loud, and the related field of mathematics. Additionally, the subsequent columns contains an informal explanation, a short example, the Unicode location, the name for use in HTML documents, and the LaTeX symbol.

Basic logic symbols

Advanced and rarely used logical symbols

These symbols are sorted by their Unicode value:

Usage in various countries

Poland and Germany 
 in Poland, the universal quantifier is sometimes written ∧, and the existential quantifier as ∨. The same applies for Germany.

Japan 
The ⇒ symbol is often used in text to mean "result" or "conclusion", as in "We examined whether to sell the product ⇒ We will not sell it". Also, the → symbol is often used to denote "changed to", as in the sentence "The interest rate changed. March 20% → April 21%".

See also

 Józef Maria Bocheński
 List of notation used in Principia Mathematica
 List of mathematical symbols
 Logic alphabet, a suggested set of logical symbols
 
 Logical connective
 Mathematical operators and symbols in Unicode
 Non-logical symbol
 Polish notation
 Truth function
 Truth table
 Wikipedia:WikiProject Logic/Standards for notation

References

Further reading
 Józef Maria Bocheński (1959), A Précis of Mathematical Logic, trans., Otto Bird, from the French and German editions, Dordrecht, South Holland:  D. Reidel.

External links
Named character entities in HTML 4.0